KZCS-LD (channel 18) is a low-power television station in Colorado Springs, Colorado, United States, airing programming from the digital multicast network Ion Mystery. It is owned and operated by the E. W. Scripps Company alongside Pueblo-licensed NBC affiliate KOAA-TV (channel 5). KZCS-LD's transmitter is located on Cheyenne Mountain. Master control and most internal operations are based at the studios of ABC affiliate KMGH-TV (channel 7) on East Speer Boulevard in Denver's Congress Park neighborhood (the Federal Communications Commission [FCC] considers KMGH-TV as the parent license of KZCS-LD).

History
The station signed on the air in 1994 on analog channel 38 as K38DM, a translator of KMGH-TV, then a CBS affiliate. It moved to channel 23 in 2003, changing its call sign to K23GJ. It assumed the KZCS-LP call sign in 2005, and became an Azteca América affiliate in 2013, relaying KMGH-TV's second digital subchannel. It switched to Escape (which later rebranded to Court TV Mystery, now Ion Mystery since 2022) in 2019, and flash-cut to digital in 2020.

Subchannels
The station's digital signal is multiplexed:

References

External links

Ion Mystery affiliates
Bounce TV affiliates
Laff (TV network) affiliates
ZCS-LD
Television channels and stations established in 1994
1994 establishments in Colorado
E. W. Scripps Company television stations
Low-power television stations in the United States